Alessandro Vecchi (born 7 March 1991) is an Italian footballer who played professionally for SPAL and Mantova. A centre-back, he is known for his eye for goal.

Club career
Born in Guastalla, in Emilia region, Vecchi started his career at Emilian club Parma. In 2010, he left for Lega Pro Prima Divisione club SPAL in temporary deal. However, he only able to play in the reserve league. In July 2011 Vecchi and Francesco Pambianchi were moved to SPAL in co-ownership deal, for €200,000 and €250,000 respectively, as a direct swap with Davide Colomba (price tag €450,000), the son of Parma's head coach at that time, Franco Colomba.

SPAL was expelled from the professional league in July 2012, thus Pambianchi and Vecchi returned to Parma on a free transfer. In August 2012 Vecchi joined Lega Pro Seconda Divisione club Mantova F.C. He remained in Mantua for 2013–14 season. The club qualified to the 2014–15 Serie C as the 8th placed team in Group A of the 2013–14 Lega Pro Seconda Divisione.

International career
Vecchi played for the Italy U-17 team in the team's 2008 UEFA European Under-17 Football Championship elite qualification campaign. He played once, in the last match, in which he replaced Luca Caldirola as the team's centre-back. Vecchi played 3 times for the Italy U-19 team: against Ukraine, Denmark and the Netherlands.

References

External links
 AIC profile (data by football.it) 

Italian footballers
Parma Calcio 1913 players
S.P.A.L. players
Mantova 1911 players
Serie C players
Association football defenders
Italy youth international footballers
People from Guastalla
Footballers from Emilia-Romagna
1991 births
Living people
Sportspeople from the Province of Reggio Emilia